Normality may refer to:

Mathematics, probability, and statistics
 Asymptotic normality, in mathematics and statistics
 Complete normality or normal space, 
 Log-normality, in probability theory
 Normality (category theory)
 Normality (statistics) or normal distribution, in probability theory
 Normality tests, used to determine if a data set is well-modeled by a normal distribution

Science
 Normality (behavior), the property of conforming to a norm
 Normality (chemistry), the equivalent concentration of a solution
 Principle of normality, in solid mechanics

Other uses
 Normality (video game), a 1996 adventure video game by Gremlin Interactive
 Normality bias, a belief people hold when considering the possibility of a disaster

See also
 Normal (disambiguation)
 Return to normalcy, a campaign slogan